The Kamenice Gorge (formerly known as Kamnitz Gorge;) is a rocky ravine between Hřensko, Mezná and Srbská Kamenice in Bohemian Switzerland in the Czech Republic. The river Kamenice flows through it and discharges near Hřensko into the Elbe.

History
The Kamenice Gorge was first travelled in 1877 by young men. Prince Edmund Clary-Aldringen had the way through the gorge widened by Italian construction workers in 1889 and in 1890 boats were used in the Edmund Gorge, also called the Silent Gorge (Czech: Edmundova soutěska or Tichá soutěska, German: Edmundsklamm or Stille Klamm). The Wild Gorge (Czech: Divoká soutěska, German: Wilde Klamm) followed in 1898. In 1881 there was a boat service to the mill of Gründmühle (now the Dolský Mill) in the adjoining Ferdinand Gorge (Ferdinandsklamm), which has been withdrawn in 1939.

External links

Kamenice Gorge – Bohemian Switzerland
Kamenice Gorge – Tourist portal of Hřensko
History of the Kamenice Gorge on the municipal website of Hřensko

Canyons and gorges of the Czech Republic
Geography of the Ústí nad Labem Region
Bohemian Switzerland
Elbe Sandstone Mountains
Děčín District
Tourist attractions in the Ústí nad Labem Region